is a Japanese singer-songwriter.

Early life and family
Ozaki was born on 24 July 1989 in Tokyo, Japan, to Japanese singer songwriter Yutaka Ozaki and Shigemi Ozaki. After his father, who was known as a legendary rock musician, died of pulmonary edema at the age of 26, Ozaki and his mother moved to Boston, United States.

Career

2004–2015: Pre-debut period
In March 2004, Ozaki covered his father's song  as a duo named Crouching Boys, with Tomi Yo. The song was included on a tribute album to Yutaka Ozaki, "Blue" A Tribute to Yutaka Ozaki, which reached number one in Japan.

Ozaki graduated from American School in Japan in June 2008 and attended Keio University Faculty of Environment and Information Studies in 2008. He worked as a radio DJ on InterFM, hosting the show Concerned Generation. In July 2012, Ozaki first played in public at Fuji Rock Festival 2012. His second show on InterFM, titled Between The Lines started in April 2013.

2016–present: Let Freedom Ring and Seize the Day
After the graduation from graduate school, Ozaki launched his music career. In July 2016, he appeared on the television music show Ongaku no Hi, and played his father's song "I Love You" and his first original song, "Hajimari no Machi". In September 2016, Ozaki embarked his first live concert as a solo singer, entitled Billboard Classics Hiroya Ozaki Premium Concert: Hajimari no Machi, at Yomiuri Otemachi Hall.

Ozaki's debut single "Hajimari no Machi" was released in September 2016, through Toy's Factory. The song peaked at number fifty on the Billboard Japan Hot 100 chart. His first extended play Let Freedom Ring was released in March 2017 to a commercial success, reaching number twenty-one in Japan. Ozaki embarked on the tour entitled Let Freedom Ring Tour 2017 in support of the extended play.

In September 2017, "Glory Days" was released as the lead single from Ozaki's second extended play. The song served as the theme song to the Japanese animated movie Psalm of Planets Eureka Seven: Hi-Evolution. The song successfully reached number thirty-eight on the Billboard Japan Hot 100 chart and topped on the iTunes Japan. His second extended play Seize the Day was released in October 2017 and peaked number thirteen in Japan. To promote the extended play, Ozaki embarked his second tour, Seize the Day Tour 2017 from October 2017, at NHK Osaka Hall. His first unplugged concert tour, One Man Stand 2017 started in December 2017.

Ozaki released a single, "Hurry Up!", with Sky-Hi and Kerenmi, in April 2018. He embarked his fourth concert tour entitled Beyond All Borders 2018 in May 2018. In September 2018, Ozaki announced that he would release a new single, .  The song serves as the theme song to the Japanese television anime series Sōten no Ken: Re:Genesis.

Discography

Extended plays

Singles

As lead artist

Promotional singles

As a featured artist

Notes

References

External links 
Official site 

1989 births
Japanese male pop singers
Japanese male singer-songwriters
Japanese singer-songwriters
Living people
Toy's Factory artists
Singers from Tokyo
21st-century Japanese singers
21st-century Japanese male singers